The zenaida dove (Zenaida aurita) is a member of the bird family Columbidae, which includes doves and pigeons. It is the national bird of Anguilla, where it is locally referred to as "turtle dove".

Description
It looks very similar to the mourning dove, but is smaller in size, has a shorter, more rounded tail, and is a bit more darkly colored. It is also distinguished from the mourning dove by showing white on the trailing edge of its wings while in flight. The mourning dove does not have the white trailing edge.

Breeding
It lays two white eggs on a flimsy platform, built on a tree or shrub. It also nests in rock crevices, and on grassy vegetation if no predators are present. It has been recorded that some birds have up to 4 broods per year.  Eggs take approximately two weeks to hatch, and the young chicks typically fledge after only two weeks in the nest. Parents feed the young pigeon's milk, a nutrient rich substance regurgitated from its crop.

Range, habitat and behaviour
The Zenaida dove breeds throughout the Caribbean and the tip of the Yucatán Peninsula, an example habitat being in the Petenes mangroves. It was reported by John James Audubon to breed in the Florida Keys, but there are only three verifiable records from Florida. It is found in a variety of open and semi-open habitats. Its mournful  call is similar to the call of a mourning dove, but faster in pace.

The bird is resident and abundant over much of its range. Zenaida doves are commonly hunted as a game bird.

Diet
These birds forage on the ground, mainly eating grains and seeds, sometimes also on insects. Zenaida doves frequently feed close to water. They often swallow fine gravel to assist with digestion, and will also ingest salt from mineral rich soils or livestock salt licks. It is thought the salt aids in egg formation and/or production of pigeon milk.

References

 "National Geographic"  Field Guide to the Birds of North America 
Handbook of the Birds of the World Vol 4,  Josep del Hoyo editor, 
 World Wildlife Fund. 2010. Petenes mangroves. eds. Mark McGinley, C.Michael Hogan & C. Cleveland. Encyclopedia of Earth. National Council for Science and the Environment. Washington DC

External links

zenaida dove
Birds of the Caribbean
Birds of Hispaniola
Birds of the Dominican Republic
Birds of Haiti
Birds of the Yucatán Peninsula
National symbols of Anguilla
zenaida dove
Taxa named by Coenraad Jacob Temminck